Shahinyan or Shaginyan  is an Armenian surname that may refer to:

Artur Shahinyan (born 1987), Armenian Greco-Roman wrestler
Hrant Shahinyan (1923–1996), Armenian gymnast
Marietta Shaginyan (1888–1982), Soviet writer and activist 
Sona Shahinyan (born 1992), Armenian football player

Armenian-language surnames